Northkill may refer to the following in the U.S. state of Pennsylvania:

Northkill Amish Settlement, in Berks County
Northkill Creek, a tributary of Tulpehocken Creek